Hanni Pestalozzi (26 April 1905 Wil - 19 April 1986 Kirchberg) was a Swiss farmer and teacher from the canton of St. Gallen. She campaigned for the training and further education of farmers.

Life 
Hanni Pestalozzi was a daughter of Friedrich Pestalozzi and Emmy Albertine Ernst. She attended the handicrafts and home economics teachers' seminar in Freiburg and worked in her parents' farm and boarding house in Hofberg near Wil.

From 1936 to 1980, she worked as a consultant on behalf of the association for rural homework in the canton of St. Gallen. She was a pioneer in the education and training of farmers' daughters and women and played a leading role in the founding and development of local women farmers' associations.

She was a board member from 1946 to 1967, and as President of the Swiss Rural Women's Association from 1946 to 1952. She contributed to the modernization of farm housework and the improvement of the status of women in the countryside.

In 1981 she became an honorary citizen of Wil.

References 

1986 deaths
1905 births
Swiss farmers
Women farmers
People from the canton of St. Gallen